Eidocamptophallus chacei is a species of crab in the family Pseudothelphusidae, and the only species in the genus Eidocamptophallus.

References

Pseudothelphusidae
Monotypic crustacean genera